The 2018 TCR Korea Touring Car Series is the first season of the TCR Korea Touring Car Series. The series supported the TCR Asia Series for their inaugural round held at Korea International Circuit in August.

Teams and drivers
All teams were Korean registered. All drivers, excepting German driver Peter Terting, raced under South Korean racing license.

Calendar and results
The provisional calendar was released on 5 February 2018, with all rounds being held within South Korea.

Championship standings

Drivers' championship

Notes

References

External links
 

TCR Korea Touring Car Series
Korea Touring Car Series